"Keep Your Head Down" (Korean title: 왜 Wae; "Why"), released in Japan as "Why? (Keep Your Head Down)", is a song recorded by South Korean pop group TVXQ (or Tohoshinki in Japan). Composed by Yoo Young-jin and Yoo Han-jin, the Korean-language version of "Keep Your Head Down" was released by S.M. Entertainment on January 3, 2011 as the lead single for the group's fifth Korean studio album Keep Your Head Down (2011), TVXQ's first album since becoming a two-piece band with U-Know Yunho and Max Changmin. The Japanese-language version of "Keep Your Head Down", which was released on January 26, 2011, by Avex Trax, served as TVXQ's 31st Japanese single in Japan. It was the first single taken from their fifth Japanese studio album, Tone (2011).

With elements of industrial hip hop and baroque pop, "Keep Your Head Down" is labeled as an SMP song, a staple genre in TVXQ's music. A sample of the song's original Korean-language version was first performed by Yunho at the SM Town Live '10 World Tour in August 2010, three months before the official announcement of TVXQ's Korean comeback. The full Korean single was released on January 3, 2011, which was accompanied by the premiere of its music video on TVXQ's official video-sharing websites.

The song was met with mixed reviews upon its debut. With lyrics talking about overcoming a relationship breakup, it was claimed that the song was a diss to JYJ, the three former members of TVXQ. Yunho and Changmin had denied the claims. Pervasively, "Keep Your Head Down" became one of the duo's most commercially successful songs. It topped real-time music charts upon its release and peaked at number five on Korea's Gaon Singles Chart. The song won seven music show trophies for three consecutive weeks and sold over 1.3 million digital units in South Korea by the end of the year. In Japan, "Keep Your Head Down" was TVXQ's ninth single to top Japan's Oricon Singles Chart. It was certified platinum by the Recording Industry Association of Japan (RIAJ), becoming TVXQ's second best-selling single in Japan. The Japanese version was used in the Japanese Wii game Just Dance Wii

Background and recording
"Keep Your Head Down", also known by its Korean title "Why" (왜), was composed by brothers Yoo Han-jin and Yoo Young-jin, who also wrote the song lyrics. An SMP song, "Keep Your Head Down" has musical influences of industrial hip hop, baroque pop, R&B, and rap. The song was originally written for Yunho, who recorded the song in early August 2010 and performed it at the SM Town Live '10 World Tour concert in Seoul on August 21, 2010. The Seoul concert marked Yunho and Changmin's first comeback appearance together since their split with former TVXQ members Kim Jae-joong, Park Yoo-chun, and Kim Jun-su in early 2010. The positive responses in their two-piece performances prompted Yunho and Changmin to return to the studios to finish the recording of TVXQ's fifth Korean studio album. "Keep Your Head Down" was then chosen as the lead single.

The song debuted on South Korea's digital charts on January 3, 2011, the same day as the premiere of the song's music video. The Japanese version of the song was released as a CD and DVD single on January 26, 2011.

Critical response
"Keep Your Head Down" received mixed responses upon its release, and its lyrics came under media scrutiny. Starting off with the self-empowering English opening lines "Do you know what time it is? This is return of the King", TVXQ sing about their determination to return stronger after breaking up with a former lover. The song ends with the protagonist claiming that his former lover has "[been] erased, disappeared, died" in his heart, and that she no longer ceases to exist.

Korean netizens claimed that the song was a diss to former members Jaejoong, Yoochun, and Junsu, who were still in legal disputes with TVXQ's agency S.M. Entertainment at the time of the song's release. Yunho and Changmin clarified that the lyrics of "Keep Your Head Down" were not directed at the trio, and that the lyrics were written in a style that could be interpreted in different ways.

Formats and track listings

Korean digital download
 "왜 (Keep Your Head Down)" – 3:58

Japanese digital download
 "Why? (Keep Your Head Down)" – 4:00
 "MAXIMUM" – 3:41

Japanese CD+DVD single AVCK-79022
Disc 1 (CD)
 "Why? (Keep Your Head Down)"
 "MAXIMUM" 
 "Why? (Keep Your Head Down)" (-Less Vocal-)
 "MAXIMUM" (-Less Vocal-)
Disc 2 (DVD)
 "Why? (Keep Your Head Down)" (Video Clip)
 "Why? (Keep Your Head Down)" (Off Shot Movie) (First Press Limited Edition only)

Japanese CD single AVCK-79023
 "Why? (Keep Your Head Down)"
 "MAXIMUM"
 "Why? (Keep Your Head Down)" -Night Rod Man Regeneration Mix-  
 "Why? (Keep Your Head Down)" (-Less Vocal-)
 "MAXIMUM" (-Less Vocal-)

Japanese Bigeast CD single AVC1-79024
 "Why? (Keep Your Head Down)"
 "MAXIMUM"
 "Why? (Keep Your Head Down)" (-Less Vocal-)
 "MAXIMUM" (-Less Vocal-)

Charts

Weekly charts

Sales

Year-end charts

Certifications

Credits
Credits adapted from album's liner notes.

Studio 
 SM Booming System – recording, mixing, digital editing
 Sonic Korea – mastering

Personnel 
 SM Entertainment – executive producer
 Lee Soo-man – producer
 Kim Young-min – executive supervisor
 TVXQ – vocals, background vocals 
 Luna – Japanese lyrics
 Yoo Young-jin – producer, Korean lyrics, composition, vocal directing, background vocals, recording, mixing, digital editing, music and sound supervisor
 Yoo Han-jin – composition, arrangement
 Jeon Hoon – mastering

References

TVXQ songs
Korean-language songs
2011 singles
Oricon Weekly number-one singles
Billboard Japan Hot 100 number-one singles
RIAJ Digital Track Chart number-one singles
Japanese television drama theme songs
Songs written by Yoo Young-jin